"Burning Bright" is the fourth single from American rock band Shinedown's debut album Leave a Whisper. A new mix of the song was featured on the re-release of Leave a Whisper, titled the "Sanford" mix. It reached number two on the Billboard Mainstream Rock Tracks chart. The song was also sampled on the track "Just to be Different" from rapper Joe Budden's Halfway House album.

Track listing

Charts

References

2000s ballads
2004 singles
Shinedown songs
Songs written by Brent Smith
2003 songs
Hard rock ballads
Songs written by Tony Battaglia
Atlantic Records singles
Song recordings produced by Bob Marlette